Rahmatabad-e Moinzadeh (also Romanized as Raḩmatābād-e Moʿīnzādeh; also known as Raḩmatābād and Rahmat Abad Kashgoo’eyeh) is a village in Koshkuiyeh Rural District, Koshkuiyeh District, Rafsanjan County, Kerman Province, Iran. At the 2006 census, its population was 142, in 34 families.

References 

Populated places in Rafsanjan County